Jim Love (1927 – May 10, 2005) was an American modernist sculptor who was born in Amarillo, Texas.  He graduated from Baylor University in 1952 with a baccalaureate in business administration.  After graduation, He moved to Houston, Texas.  He rose to prominence in 1961 when his assemblages of found objects were included in the groundbreaking exhibition The Art of Assemblage at the Museum of Modern Art in New York City.  Jim Love died in May 2005. Margaret McDermott, wife of University of Texas at Dallas founder Eugene McDermott presented the Jack sculpture to the university in 1976. The sculpture is affectionately known on campus as the Love Jack. In May 2021, the "Love Jack" was moved to a more central location on the UTD campus.

References

 Clothier, Peter and Jim Edwards, The Poetic Object: Hannelore Baron, Varujan Boghosian, Wallace Berman, Doris Cross, Roy Fridge, George Herms, Jess, Jim Love, David McManaway, Betye Saar, San Antonio, Tex, San Antonio Museum of Art, 1988.
 Herbert, Lynn McLanahan, From Now On, London, Philip Wilson, 2006
 Love, Jim, Jim Love, In Pursuit of the Bear, Houston, Contemporary Arts Museum, 1973.
 Love, Jim, Jim Love Up to Now, A Selection, Houston, Tex., Institute for the Arts, Rice University, 1980.
 Williams, Charles Truett, Charles T. Williams, Retrospective with Friends: Charles T. Williams, Roy Fridge, Jim Love, David McManaway, Gene Owens, Denton, TX, University of North Texas Press, 1998.
 Chron.com - Renowned sculptor Jim Love dies

Modern sculptors
1927 births
2005 deaths
20th-century American sculptors
20th-century American male artists
American male sculptors
Baylor University alumni